The Waco Aircraft Company (WACO) was an aircraft manufacturer located in Troy, Ohio, United States. Between 1920 and 1947, the company produced a wide range of civilian biplanes.

The company initially started under the name Weaver Aircraft Company of Ohio but changed its name to the Waco Aircraft Company in 1928/29.

Company name
WACO (referring to the aircraft) is usually pronounced "wah-co" (the first syllable pronounced as in "water"), not "way-co" like Waco, Texas, whose name is entirely unrelated.

Several companies operated under the Waco name, with the first company being the Weaver Aircraft Company, a firm founded by George E. Weaver, Clayton Bruckner, and Elwood Junkin in 1920 in Lorain and Medina, Ohio after they had already been collaborating for several years. In the spring of 1923 this became the Advance Aircraft Company in Troy, Ohio, after the departure of Weaver.

In 1929, it was changed from Advance Aircraft Company to Waco Aircraft Company. The firm is often confused with Western Aviation Company, the name of four unrelated aircraft enterprises in Chicago, Illinois; San Antonio, Texas; and Burbank, California.

History

Origins and early success
Waco's history started in 1919 when businessmen Clayton J. "Clayt" Brukner and Elwood "Sam" Junkin met barnstorming pilots Charles "Charley" William Meyers and George "Buck" Weaver. Although their initial floatplane design was a failure, they went on to found the Waco company in 1920 and established themselves as producers of reliable, rugged planes that were popular with travelling businessmen, postal services and explorers, especially after the company began producing closed-cabin biplane models after 1930 in addition to the open cockpit biplanes.

The Waco name was extremely well represented in the U.S. civil aircraft registry between the wars, with more Wacos registered than the aircraft of any other company. Production types including open cockpit biplanes, cabin biplanes and cabin sesquiplanes (known by Waco as Custom Cabins) as well as numerous experimental types.

World War II
During World War II, Waco produced large numbers of military gliders for the RAF and US Army Air Forces for airborne operations, especially during the Normandy Invasion and Operation Market Garden. The Waco CG-4 was the most numerous of their glider designs to be produced. At the same time Waco produced over 600 of its UPF-7 open biplanes and 21 VKS-7F cabin biplanes for the Civilian Pilot Training Program, which supplemented the output of the military training establishments. 42 privately owned models of sixteen types were impressed into service as light transports and utility aircraft with the USAAF under the common designation C-72/UC-72.

End of normal operations
Waco ceased operations in 1947, having suffered the fate of a number of general aviation companies when an anticipated boom in aviation following World War II failed to develop.
The final Waco relied on an experimental Franklin engine which, with the cancellation of other contracts became so expensive, the Aristocraft, which relied on it, was cancelled.

Revivals

Modern European WACOs
The Waco brand name was briefly revived, in the 1960s and early 1970s—for a scheme to produce, assemble, re-assemble or market a series of modern, all-metal Italian and French lightplanes (semi-monocoque, enclosed-cabin, low-wing, single-engine) under licence in the United States. The program was headed by a "Mr. Berger," and the enterprise was known (in 1968) as Waco Aircraft Co., a subsidiary of Allied Aero Industries, Inc., and based at Pottstown-Limerick Airport, Pottstown, Pennsylvania, with dealers in Connecticut, Georgia, Oklahoma, Texas, California, and Ontario, Canada. The European WACOs—in some cases replacing the original Lycoming engines with less-popular Franklin engines (Mr. Berger was involved with Franklin) -- were to be manufactured (or at least assembled or re-assembled) in the U.S. by WACO Aircraft Company at Syracuse, New York. Only several dozen (perhaps 65-150) of these European-origin aircraft were sold as WACOs before the death of Mr. Berger put an end to the program. These planes included:
 WACO Sirrus – a relabeled Italian SIAI Marchetti S.205 comparable to the Piper PA-28 Cherokee line, a four-seat touring airplane offered with fixed or retractable gear, and Franklin or Lycoming engines ranging from 180 to 220 horsepower.
 WACO Vela – the Italian SIAI Marchetti S.208, an enhanced, five-seat version of the Sirrus / S.205, with 260 horsepower, retractable landing gear, and flush-riveted, laminar-flow wings—arguably in the same class as the Beech Bonanza line. It came with an autopilot as standard equipment—unusual for aircraft of its class, at that time—and the first fault-annunciator panel in a general aviation airplane.
 WACO Meteor – a relabeled Italian SIAI Marchetti F.250 / SF.260 fast, acrobatic, three-seat sport / trainer / touring plane, later offered, by others, in manufactured metal versions, metal and wood kitplanes, and as a plans-built wooden aircraft (as for instance, the SF.260, and Sequoia). Marketed in the United States under the name Waco TS-250-3 Meteor, only four were shipped to the U.S.
 WACO Minerva – relabeled French Morane-Saulnier Minerva or Rallye, a four-seat STOL aircraft designed for use in and out of very small, unimproved landing strips, later produced by French SOCATA as the SOCATA Rallye. (Reportedy, only 3 WACO Minervas were delivered.)

Modern production
The WACO Classic Aircraft company (unrelated to the original Waco) began building its WACO Classic YMF in 1986, an upgraded version based on Waco's original type certified design.

Surviving aircraft
A large number of survivors exist, with the largest single collection residing at the Historic Aircraft Restoration Museum at Dauster Field, Creve Coeur, near St Louis, Missouri.

Models

Note: Waco civilian designations describe the configuration of the aircraft. The first letter lists the engine used, the second the specific type, and the third the general series. The coding system was changed in 1929 with several letters reassigned, and later with the introduction of the Custom Cabin series, the third letter 'C' was initially replaced with C-S (Cabin-Standard) and finally S. The numeral suffix represents the first year of production if it is 6 or higher (6=1936), or a sub type if 2 or less. Thus EGC-7 is a Wright R-760-E2 engined, cabin biplane airframe, custom cabin model first manufactured in 1937.

Many Waco Cabin Biplanes that were originally sold as civilian aircraft, were impressed into military service in World War II. The United States Army Air Forces classified theirs regardless of type as Waco C-72s, with type letters identifying specific models. Other countries used other designations for their own Wacos.

Open cockpit biplanes and monoplanes
 Waco Cootie Single seat biplane/parasol monoplane, 1 produced, then re-built
 Waco models 4 through 7 Used many Curtiss JN-4 parts with new interchangeable wing panels and powered by a  Curtiss OX-5.
 Waco 8 First Waco cabin biplane, powered by  Liberty - 1 built
 Waco 9 First mass-production model, steel-tube framing, powered by OX-5, equipped for EDO floats. Many re-engined. 270 built.
Miss Pittsburgh

 Waco 10 Most produced model of any Waco aircraft, 1,623 built between 1927 and 1933. Refinement of Waco 9 with  Curtiss OX-5 V8 engine. Redesignated GXE by Waco in 1928.
Waco 240: 1 conversion of Waco 10 with  Continental W-670 radial engine.
Waco ASO: Waco 10 variant with  Wright J-5 radial engine, known as J-5 Straightwing, Waco Sport, and Whirlwind Waco. 95 built.
Waco BSO: Variant of ASO  Wright J-6-5 radial engine. 45 built.
Waco CSO: Variant of ASO with  Wright J-6-7 radial engine. 59 built.
Waco DSO: Variant of ASO with  Hispano-Suiza A/E V8 engine. 62 built.
Waco HSO: Variant of ASO with  Packard DR-980 engine. 1 built.
Waco ATO: Taperwing variant of ASO. 54 built.
Waco CTO: Taperwing variant of CSO. 35 built.
Waco HTO: Modified from HSO. 1 built.
Waco JTO: 300 h.p. Wright J-6-9. 1 built.
Waco JYO: U.S. Navy version of JTO for evaluation. 2 built.

 Waco Mailplanes
Waco JWM: Straightwing mailplane with  Wright R-975 engine. Derivative of ASO with 14" fuselage stretch. 2 built.
Waco JYM: Taperwing mailplane with  Wright J-6-9 radial engine. Derivative of ATO with 14" fuselage stretch. 4 built for Northwest Airways

 Waco A series
Waco IBA: Improved KBA, side by side two seat biplane with optional canopy and  Kinner B-5 engine. 3 built.
Waco KBA:  Kinner K-5 radial engine. 50 built.
Waco PBA: IBA variant with  Jacobs LA-1 radial engine. 4 built.
Waco RBA: IBA variant with  Warner Scarab radial engine. 4 built.
Waco UBA: IBA variant with  Continental R-670 radial engine. 6 built.
Waco PLA: Improved IBA, known as Waco Sportsman, with Jacobs LA-1 radial engine and greater range. 4 built.
Waco ULA: PLA variant with  Continental R-670 radial engine. 1 built.

Waco D series
Waco CHD Multipurpose military biplane with  Wright J-6-7 Whirlwind radial engine.
Waco JHD Multipurpose military biplane with  Wright J-6-9 Whirlwind radial engine. 6 exported to Uruguay.
Waco S2HD Multipurpose military export biplane with  Pratt & Whitney Wasp Junior SB radial engine. 1 exported to Cuba
Waco S3HD Multipurpose military biplane with  Pratt & Whitney Wasp Junior TB. 1 built.
Waco S3HD-A Armed variant of S3HD but otherwise similar, 4 exported to Cuba.
Waco WHD Multipurpose military biplane with  Wright J-6-9 Whirlwind engine. 5 built, including 4 exported to Nicaragua.
Waco CMD Multipurpose military biplane with  Wright J-6-7 Whirlwind. None built.

Waco F series

Waco OBF:  Kinner C-5 engine. Unknown if built.
Waco PBF:  Jacobs LA-1 engine. 4 built.
Waco TBF:  Kinner R-5(?) engine. None built.
Waco UBF & Waco UBF-2: p Continental R-670 engine. Around 11 built. (two built for US Navy late in the USS Macon airship program as XJW-1 trainers with skyhooks for launch and recovery from the airship).

Waco PCF:  Jacobs LA-1 radial engine. 3 built.
Waco QCF:  Continental A-70 radial engine. 31 built.
Waco UCF: p Continental R-670 radial engine. None built, became UBF.

Waco UMF-3 &Waco UMF-5:  Continental R-670 radial engine. 18 built.
Waco YMF-3:  Jacobs L-4 radial engine. 18 built -3 & -5.
Waco YMF-5:  Jacobs L-4 radial engine. Basis for YMF-5 Super currently in production.

Waco INF:  Kinner B-5 radial engine. 50 built.
Waco KNF:  Kinner K-5 radial engine. 20 built.
Waco MNF:  Menasco C-4 Pirate inline engine. 4 built.
Waco QNF:  Continental A-70 radial engine. 1 built.

Waco RNF:  Warner Scarab radial engine. 177 built.

Waco CPF & Waco CPF-6:  Wright R-760 radial engine. 41 built, redesignated DPF.
Waco DPF-6 & Waco DPF-7:  Wright R-760 radial engine. Was CPF.
Waco EPF-6:  Wright R-760 radial engine. 1 built.
Waco LPF-6:  Lycoming R-680 radial engine. Possibly not built.
Waco UPF-6:  Continental R-670 radial engine. Prototype for UPF-7.
Waco UPF-7: Second-most produced variant, over 600 built. Continental W-670  engine. Widely used in the Civilian Pilot Training Program. 14 became YPT-14 trainers, but not adopted by USAAF for operational use.
Waco VPF-6 & Waco VPF-7:  Continental W-670 radial engine. 6 built.

Waco YPF-6 & Waco YPF-7:  Jacobs L-4 radial engine. 8 built.
Waco ZPF-6 & Waco ZPF-7:  Jacobs L-5 radial engine. 5 built.

Waco CRG
  Wright R-760 radial engine, later a different Wright R-760.

Waco RPT-1 Low wing open cockpit monoplane trainer prototype, similar in concept to Fairchild PT-19. 1 built.

Waco Standard Cabin Biplanes

Waco BDC: with  Wright R-540 engine. None built.
Waco ODC: with  Kinner C-5 engine. modified to QDC.
Waco PDC: with  Jacobs LA-1 engine. 2 built on special order.
Waco QDC: with  Continental A-70 engine. 37 built.
Waco UDC: with  Continental R-670 engine. None built.

Waco OEC: with  Kinner C-5 engine. 3 built.
Waco UEC: with  Continental R-670 engine. 40 built.
Waco BEC: with  Wright R-540 engine. 1 built (converted from OEC or UEC).

Waco UIC: with  Continental R-670 engine. 83 built.

Waco CJC & Waco CJC-S: with  Wright R-760 engine. 41 CJC & DJC built.
Waco DJC, Waco DJC-S & Waco DJS: with  Wright R-760 engine.

Waco UKC, Waco UKC-S & Waco UKS-6: with p Continental R-670. 40 built.
Waco VKS-7: with  Continental R-670-B engine. 18 built.
Waco VKS-7F: VKS-7 for CPTP with flaps. 21 built.
Waco YKC, Waco YKC-S & Waco YKS-6: with  Jacobs L-4

Waco ZKC, Waco ZKC-S & Waco ZKS: with  Jacobs L-5 engine. 60 YKC built, 22 YKC-S built, 65 YKS-6 built; Several ZKS-7 built, one converted to HKS-7 (300 HP Lycoming R-680-13 in 1947).

Waco Custom Cabin Biplanes (sesquiplanes)

Waco UOC:  Continental R-670-A or  Continental R-670-B engine. 4 built.
YOC:  Jacobs L-4 engine. 50+ YOC & YOC-1 built.
YOC-1:  Jacobs L-5 engine.

Waco CUC:  Wright R-760-E engine. 30+ built of all CUC types.
Waco CUC-1:  Wright R-760-E1 engine.
Waco CUC-2:  Wright R-760 engine.

Waco AQC-6:  Jacobs L-5 engine. 7 built.
Waco CQC-6:  Wright R-760 engine. None built.
Waco DQC-6:  Wright R-760 engine. 11 built.

Waco EQC-6:  Wright R-760 engine. 20 built. USCG used 3 as J2W-1.
Waco SQC-6:  Pratt & Whitney Wasp Jr engine. None built.
Waco UQC-6:  Continental R-670 or  W-670-K or  W-670-6. Probably none built.
Waco VQC-6:  Continental W-670 engine.
Waco YQC-6:  Jacobs L-4 engine. 13 built. 1 ex-RAAF example re-engined with  DeHavilland Gypsy 6 inline engine.
Waco ZQC-6:  Jacobs L-5 engine. 68 built.

Waco AGC-8:  Jacobs L-6 engine. 17 built, 2 modified to EGC-8.
Waco DGC-7:  Wright R-760 engine. 2 built.
Waco EGC-7, Waco EGC-8:  Wright R-760 engine. 38 built. 3 used by US Navy & Coast Guard as J2W.
Waco MGC-8: Menasco Pirate inline engine. Unknown number built.
Waco UGC-7:  Continental R-670 engine. None built.
Waco VGC-7:  Continental W-670 engine. None built.
Waco YGC-7, Waco YGC-8:  Jacobs L-4 engine. Possibly none built.
Waco ZGC-7, Waco ZGC-8:  Jacobs L-5 engine. 28 built.

Waco S series (1935-1940)
 Standard cabin designs in production were redesignated with an S type letter to distinguish them from the new Custom Cabin series.

Waco N series (1937–1938)
 Waco AVN-8: Nosewheel Type with  Jacobs L-6 engine. 15 built.
 Waco ZVN-7 & Waco ZVN-8: Nosewheel Type with  Jacobs L-5 engine. 6 built.

Waco E series (1939–1940)

 Waco ARE Aristocrat:  Jacobs L-6 engine. 4 built.
 Waco HRE Aristocrat:  Lycoming R-680 engine. 5 built.
 Waco SRE Aristocrat:  Pratt & Whitney R-985 engine. 21 built.
 Waco WRE Aristocrat:  Wright R-975 engine. None built.

Gliders

 WACO Primary Glider: single place trainer
 Waco CG-3: troop glider intended for training CG-4 pilots
 Waco CG-4, also known as the "Hadrian", troop glider
 Waco CG-13: troop glider
 Waco CG-15: troop glider

Transports
 Northwestern XPG-1: Powered version of CG-4 Glider, 2x Franklin 6AC-298-N3
 Ridgefield XPG-2: Powered version of CG-4 Glider, 2x Ranger L-440-1
 Waco YC-62: All-wood twin-engine Transport (not built)
 Waco C-72
 Waco Aristocraft: Monoplane pusher cabin transport with engine in nose. Last Waco design to be built. 1 Prototype only.

References

Bibliography

Books

Websites

External links

 Waco Air Museum Troy, Ohio
 Detailed listing of Waco models and specifications at Aerofiles
 Waco type codes explained
 The Spirit of Adventure: Flying the USA and Europe, low and slow in a Waco open-cockpit biplane
 Wright State University's archive of Waco records
 Smithsonian National Air and Space Museum Waco Aircraft Company Archives  
 AeroSpace Show - (RTP-TV 2003) Video Story On Waco Biplane 
 Waco Classic
 Historic Aircraft Restoration Museum – has a number of Waco aircraft on display
 

Companies based in Ohio
Vehicle manufacturing companies established in 1920
Defunct aircraft manufacturers of the United States
1920 establishments in Ohio
Vehicle manufacturing companies disestablished in 1947
1947 disestablishments in Ohio